Joseph Franklin Holt III (July 6, 1924 – July 14, 1997) was an American politician who was a U.S. Representative from California from 1953 to 1961.

Life and career
Born in Springfield, Massachusetts, Holt moved to Los Angeles, California, with his parents, at the age of one. He grew up there, and attended the public schools. Holt later enlisted as a private in the United States Marine Corps and was called to active duty in July 1943 during World War II. He was discharged as a second lieutenant in October 1945. He returned home and attended the University of Southern California where he received a Bachelor of Science degree in 1947. He later went into in the insurance business and then entered the field of public relations. Eventually he became the state president of the Young Republicans of California and was Richard Nixon's field director during Nixon's 1950 Senate race against Helen Gahagan Douglas. In January 1951, he was recalled to active duty with the Marine Corps and volunteered for duty in the Korean War. He was wounded in action and awarded the Purple Heart.

Holt was elected as a Republican to the 83rd United States Congress in 1952. He stayed for three terms until he declined to run for re-election in 1960. In the 1952 Republican primary for the newly drawn 22nd congressional district in southern California, he was aided by the strong endorsement of Richard Nixon. His opponent, the state senator Jack Tenney, felt that Nixon, a popular U.S. senator, should have remained neutral in the race, but Nixon countered by saying that Holt represented the sort of young veteran that Congress needed.

During a visit to the Soviet Union in 1955, Holt was held at gun point by a Soviet Army officer, who demanded that he cease taking photographs of a church near Moscow.

Holt voted in favor of the Civil Rights Act of 1957 and the Civil Rights Act of 1960.

Holt attempted, unsuccessfully, to return to Congress in 1968, but was defeated in the general election by the incumbent, James Corman. He spent the rest of his career as a business consultant and died in Santa Maria, California, on July 14, 1997.

Notes

References

1924 births
1997 deaths
People from Santa Maria, California
United States Marine Corps officers
Republican Party members of the United States House of Representatives from California
20th-century American politicians
United States Marine Corps personnel of World War II
Military personnel from California